Katarzyna Ponikwia (born 29 October 1982) is a Polish biathlete. She competed in three events at the 2006 Winter Olympics.

References

1982 births
Living people
Biathletes at the 2006 Winter Olympics
Polish female biathletes
Olympic biathletes of Poland
Sportspeople from Zakopane